We All Want the Same Things is the third studio album by Craig Finn. It was released on Partisan Records on March 24, 2017.

The title comes from a line in the song "God in Chicago". Craig Finn said, "It seems like a bit of dark humor in these turbulent political times, but it also rings true: No matter our differences, we all have some very basic wants and needs that line up with each other."

Critical reception
At Metacritic, which assigns a weighted average score out of 100 to reviews from mainstream critics, the album received an average score of 73% based on 15 reviews, indicating "generally favorable reviews".

Sarah Murphy of Exclaim! gave the album a 6 out of 10, saying, "We All Want the Same Things won't quench the casual fan's thirst for new drunken bar rock anthems, but for those willing to listen a bit more closely (and quietly), Finn's solo work still provides some stories worth hearing. Sam Sodomsky of Pitchfork gave the album a 7.8 out of 10 and called it "a remarkable record not for sounding like a return-to-form, but for feeling like entirely new territory without sacrificing its thrill or familiarity."

Track listing

Charts

References

External links
 

2017 albums
Craig Finn albums
Partisan Records albums